The Crowbar is a type of cocktail made with only Crown Royal whiskey and lemon-lime soda. The name refers to the construction workers in Canada that would order these drinks after a long day of hard labor building railroad tracks in the 1940s. It was said to ease the pain after ten hours of extremely demanding physical labor laying down railroad ties.

The standard for Crowbars has been recently relaxed to include any kind of whiskey, not just Crown Royal. There is no requirement for which kind of lemon-lime soda is used.

References

Cocktails with whisky
History of rail transport in Canada
Lemon-lime sodas